Nickolas Glennie-Smith is an English film score composer, conductor, and musician who is a frequent collaborator with Hans Zimmer, contributing to scores including The Rock (nominated for the Academy Award for Best Sound), the 2006 historical film Children of Glory and the 1993 spy thriller Point of No Return. Glennie-Smith has also composed the scores for the films Home Alone 3, The Man in the Iron Mask, We Were Soldiers, Secretariat, the score for the Disney direct-to-video animated film The Lion King II: Simba's Pride, Lauras Stern, Der kleine Eisbär 2 - Die geheimnisvolle Insel and A Sound of Thunder.

Glennie-Smith is a part of Hans Zimmer's film score company Remote Control Productions, for which he has conducted music for the soundtracks on The Simpsons Movie, Transformers: Revenge of the Fallen, X-Men: First Class and Pirates of the Caribbean: On Stranger Tides. He was Zimmer's accompanist on the score for Man of Steel.

Glennie-Smith is the master composer of the music in the French theme park le Puy du Fou. He has collaborated with the former Pink Floyd bassist, Roger Waters. He worked on Waters' score for the 1986 film When the Wind Blows, then provided some of the keyboard overdubbing for the song "The Powers that Be" on Waters' 1987 Radio K.A.O.S. album. He performed at the 1990 concert The Wall Live in Berlin as a keyboardist alongside Peter Wood. He also toured in the 1980s with Cliff Richard, again playing keyboards.  In 1987, he was responsible, with producer Vic Coppersmith-Heaven and singer Kenny Young, for the album Transmissions under the group name Gentlemen Without Weapons.

Musical career
Glennie-Smith was born in London. In 1975 he started his musical career with the band Wally, performing keyboards on their second album, Valley Gardens. In 1980, he played keyboards on Leo Sayer's album Living in a Fantasy. Also in 1980, he started recording and touring with Cliff Richard, appearing on three albums, I'm No Hero (synthesizer), Wired for Sound (engineer, piano on one song), and The Rock Connection (synthesizer on one song).

Glennie-Smith is also known for his contributions on Roger Daltrey's solo albums, Under a Raging Moon, and Can't Wait to See the Movie, and Paul McCartney's solo albums Press to Play, and Flowers in the Dirt.

He has also worked with many other artists including Phil Collins, Tina Turner, Elvis Costello, Pharrell Williams, Nik Kershaw, Duane Eddy, Katrina & the Waves, and The Adventures.

Filmography

As primary composer

As Other

References

External links
 
 
 Page at Hans-Zimmer.com

20th-century British composers
20th-century British male musicians
21st-century British composers
21st-century British male musicians
English film score composers
English male film score composers
Living people
Musicians from London
Year of birth missing (living people)